The following lists events that happened during 1987 in Singapore.

Incumbents
President: Wee Kim Wee
Prime Minister: Lee Kuan Yew

Events

January
14 January – The Mandarin Oriental Singapore is officially opened.
24 January – The last nightsoil bucket system is phased out in Lorong Halus, signalling the beginning of complete modern sanitation in Singapore.

March
1 March – A new Have Three or More (if you can afford it) policy is announced to encourage people to have three or more children. This comes after significant decreases in population through the previous 'Stop at Two' policy of 1972.
6 March – The National Solidarity Party is formed.

April
3 April – The Housing and Development Board (HDB) introduces a new scheme for families with third children to upgrade to bigger flats. This comes after the new 'Have Three or More (if you can afford it)' policy is announced a month ago.

May
3 May – The first vertical marathon is held at Westin Stamford to raise funds for Community Chest.
9 May – The Bukit Timah Satellite Earth Station is officially opened.
15 May – The PSA Building is officially opened, serving as PSA's headquarters.
21 May – 21 people are arrested in Operation Spectrum for the Marxist conspiracy.

June
20 June – As part of Operation Spectrum, another 6 are detained, with 4 of the 16 arrested earlier released from detention.

July
11 July – Construction starts on Changi Airport's new Terminal 2, which will be linked to Terminal 1 via an automated people mover (now known as Changi Airport Skytrain).

August
6 August – SMRT Corporation is formed.
14 August – The Public Transport Council is formed to regulate public transport fares and standards.
26 August – The Van Kleef Aquarium reopens after an 18-month revamp.

September
2 September – The cleanup of the Singapore River was declared complete.
28 September – The $1 and 1-cent Second Series Coins are launched.

November
7 November – The initial section of the MRT, between Yio Chu Kang and Toa Payoh, was opened.
28 November – The Environment Building is officially opened as the Ministry of the Environment's (now Ministry of Sustainability and the Environment) headquarters, bringing together all of ENV's departments under one roof.

December
10 December – The Omniplanetarium (present-day Omni-Theatre) is officially opened.
12 December – The second section of the MRT was opened, stretching from Novena to Outram Park.
 28 December – Singapore Indoor Stadium starts construction. When completed, it will help to enhance sports and entertainment events, which is completed in 1989.

Births
 22 January – Daphne Khoo, singer, contestant of Singapore Idol (Season 1).
 12 March - Maxi Lim, actor.
 18 May - Ya Hui, actress
 1 July – Charmaine Yee, radio DJ.
 6 August – Sezairi Sezali, singer, winner of Singapore Idol (Season 3).
 11 October – Wang Weiliang, actor.
 Louis Chua – politician.

Deaths
 16 November – Zubir Said - Composer of Majulah Singapura (b. 1907).
 17 November – Lim Nang Seng - Sculptor (b. 1917).
 28 November – Goh Choo San - Choreographer, ballet dancer (b. 1948).

References

 

 
Singapore
Years in Singapore